"Come to Me" is a song by Australian rock musician Diesel; it was his first release credited to "Diesel" instead of "Johnny Diesel". The song was included on his 1992 debut album, Hepfidelity, and when released in November 1991, it peaked at number eight in Australia and number three in New Zealand. It is certified Gold in the latter country for selling over 5,000 copies.

Track listings
Australian CD single
 "Come to Me" – 4:24
 "Something to You" – 4:46

Australian 7-inch single
A. "Come to Me" – 4:22
B. "Rear View Mirror" – 5:11

UK and European maxi-single
 "Come to Me"
 "Rear View Mirror"
 "Come to Me"

Charts

Weekly charts

Year-end charts

Certifications

References

External links

1991 singles
1991 songs
Chrysalis Records singles
Diesel (musician) songs
EMI Records singles
Parlophone singles
Songs written by Diesel (musician)
Song recordings produced by Terry Manning